David Hunt Blair (January 13, 1868 – September 13, 1945) served as Commissioner of Internal Revenue from 1921–1929.

Blair was associated with Col. Francis Henry Fries the President of Wachovia Bank previous to his appointment as Commissioner of Internal Revenue.

Blair was born in High Point, North Carolina. He was selected by United States Secretary of the Treasury Andrew Mellon, who thought that as a teetotaller from a strongly pro-prohibition region of North Carolina, Blair would be the best individual to help enforce the Eighteenth Amendment.

However, Blair was criticized for asserting in a speech that every bootlegger should be stood before a wall and shot to death. He was also criticized for issuing a leaflet urging all citizens to spy on their neighbors and to use telephones outside their neighborhoods to report Prohibition offenders anonymously. On the other hand, many "drys" (proponents of Prohibition) criticized him for allegedly hampering his enforcement officers by requiring them to follow the law and verify that alleged bootleg beverages were actually alcoholic before seizing them and taking other legal actions.

Blair was a delegate to the 1924 Republican National Convention from North Carolina.

References

Sources
 IRS list of commissioners
 "Prohibition enforcement", report by Blair and Lincoln C. Andrews to Congress, 1927.
 Political Graveyard entry

1868 births
1945 deaths
Commissioners of Internal Revenue
Prohibition in the United States
People from High Point, North Carolina
North Carolina Republicans